Bağırlı or Bagyrly may refer to:
Bağırlı, Kalbajar, Azerbaijan
Bağırlı, Shamakhi, Azerbaijan